Porgy and Bess is an album by Harry Belafonte and Lena Horne, released by RCA Victor in 1959. It features songs from George Gershwin's opera Porgy and Bess. Belafonte and Horne sing two songs together: "There's a Boat That's Leavin' Soon for New York" and "Bess, You Is My Woman Now". The album was re-issued on a 2-CD set in 2003 together with Jamaica by BMG Collectables in Stereo.

Track listing
All music composed by George Gershwin, lyricists indicated.
"A Woman is a Sometime Thing" (DuBose Heyward) – 2:40
"Summertime" (Heyward) – 3:11
"Oh I Got Plenty of Nothing" (Ira Gershwin, Heyward) – 3:00
"I Wants to Stay Here" (I. Gershwin, Heyward) – 3:30
"Bess, You Is My Woman Now" (I. Gershwin, Heyward) – 5:57
"It Ain't Necessarily So" (I. Gershwin) – 3:03
"Street Calls": "Strawberry Woman" / "The Honey Man" / "Crab Man" (Heyward) – 4:17
"My Man's Gone Now" – 4:05
"Bess, Oh Where's My Bess" (I. Gershwin) – 3:36
"There's a Boat That's Leavin' Soon for New York" – 2:37

Personnel
Harry Belafonte – vocals
Lena Horne – vocals
Production notes:
Bob Bollard – producer
Fred Reynolds – producer
Lennie Hayton – arrangements, musical director
Robert Corman – arrangements, musical director
Ernest Oelrich – engineer
Murray Laden – cover photo

References

1959 albums
Vocal duet albums
Harry Belafonte albums
Lena Horne albums
Albums arranged by Lennie Hayton
RCA Records albums
Harry Belafonte and Lena Horne album